Eleanor Markham (born c. 1872) was an American woman who became one of the most prominent cases of an averted premature burial in the late 19th century.

According to news reports at the time, the 22-year-old Miss Markham was pronounced dead in Sprakers, New York on July 8, 1894, by a Dr. Howard, the family physician.  Since the weather was quite warm, it was decided to have the burial quickly, and her coffin was closed and fastened after family members said goodbye on the morning of July 10.  But on the way to the graveyard, the hearse was stopped after a noise was heard coming from the coffin.  The lid was unfastened to find Miss Markham alive, exclaiming "You are burying me alive!," to which Dr. Howard reportedly said, "Hush child, you are all right.  It is a mistake easily rectified." 

Markham soon after fainted, but recovered after being administered  some stimulants.  She stated that she had been conscious the entire time of the preparations for burial, but was unable to cry out.  She fully believed she would be buried alive, when finally, using all her will, she was able to make a knocking noise to draw attention.(5 September 1894). Notes and Notions, Fort Wayne Gazette (one sentence report, states her age was 22 years old)
The fear of premature burial was a topic of substantial discussion in the late 19th and early 20th century.  Markham's case was among those included in the book Premature Burial and How It May Be Prevented by William Tebb and Edward Vollum.  Bill Bryson also mentions the "well-known case" of Markham in his 2010 book At Home: A Short History of Private Life.

References

Premature burials
1872 births
People from Montgomery County, New York
Year of death missing